The Pacific Palisades Highlands is a neighborhood located in Pacific Palisades, a community in the Westside of Los Angeles, California. The Palisades Highlands is situated in the northern part of the Palisades bordering Topanga State Park and the Upper Santa Ynez Canyon. The Highlands has its own shopping center and access to several Topanga State Park trailheads.

Areas

Country Estates
A guard gated community of 80 estates ranging from $2–18 million located on the farthest west part of the Palisades. The houses range from about 4,000 square feet to 13,000 square feet and are situated on large lots ranging from half an acre to over four acres. All of the homes have mountain views, and are revered for their privacy and spaciousness. Many celebrities have had homes in this neighborhood, such as James Worthy, Chevy Chase, Steve Guttenberg, and Jeffrey Tambor among others.

Palisades Hills
Piedra Morada (with its few branching streets) make up the Palisades Hills. Prices range from $2–10 million, with views of the Pacific. This is the oldest part of the highlands and the highest part at around 1,600 feet above sea level

The Summit
The newest construction in the Highlands that has been completed since the early 2000s, homes range from $2–12 million, which include views of the Pacific. This area includes The Summit Club which is a recreation center with numerous tennis courts, a pool and multiple children's play structures.

Lower Highlands
The Lower Highlands includes homes and condominiums as well as a shaping center and various commercial properties.
The Highlands development began in the early 1970s. Housing development in the Highlands is now reaching its final stage as residences are being built at the highest point at the northeast border between Pacific Palisades and Topanga State Park in what was once open land.

History
The mouth of Santa Ynez Canyon at the Pacific Ocean was once home of Inceville, an early 1900s film studio. Filming ceased at the property around 1922, and the buildings burned to the ground in 1924. In 1921, the land that is now known as Pacific Palisades was purchased by Methodists. Over time, roads that were named after Methodist missionaries were developed, and land was settled.

The Highlands development began in the early 1970s. Housing development in the Highlands is now reaching its final stage as residences are being built at the highest point at the northeast border between Pacific Palisades and Topanga State Park. The Highlands are the most recent large-scale development in Pacific Palisades.

Controversy
The development was originally protested by area residents and environmentalists because it cut through the heart of Topanga Park.

Local services and infrastructure

Fire service
Los Angeles Fire Department Station 23 serves the area.

Law enforcement and security
The Palisades Highlands is served by the Los Angeles Police Department. However as a result of the area's geographic isolation the community heavily relies on private security patrols.

Education
The area is assigned to Los Angeles Unified School District schools:
 Marquez Charter Elementary School
 Revere Charter Middle School
 Palisades Charter High School

References

Neighborhoods in Los Angeles
Pacific Palisades, Los Angeles